Damodar N. Gujarati is a professor of economics at the United States Military Academy at West Point, and author/co-author of the Basic Econometrics textbook, among others. The textbook has been published in 5 editions over the last 21 years, and translated into French, Spanish, Portuguese, Korean, Chinese, Turkish, and Persian.

Selected publications

Books
Gujarati, Damodar N. Basic Econometrics. New York: McGraw-Hill, 1978.  Held in 784 WorldCat libraries 
Third ed., 1995.   (with Dawn C Porter)
fifth ed, 2009 (with Dawn C Porter)
review  Journal of Applied Econometrics 
Gujarati, Damodar N. Essentials of Econometrics. New York: McGraw-Hill, 1992.  (abridged version of Basic Econometrics.)
White, Kenneth J., Linda T. M. Bui, and Damodar N. Gujarati. Basic Econometrics ; A Computer Handbook Using SHAZAM for Use with Gujarati: Basic Econometrics, Second Edition. New York: McGraw-Hill, 1988.
Gujarati, Damodar N. Principios de econometria. Aravaca, Madrid: Mac Graw- Hill interamericana, 2006. Spanish translation)
Gujarati, Damodar N. Économétrie. Bruxelles: De Boeck, 2004. (French translation)
Gujarati, Damodar N., and Tao Zhang.经济计量学精要 = Jing ji ji liang xue jing yao. Jing ji jiao cai yi cong. Beijing: Ji xie gong ye chu ban she, 2006. (Chinese Translation)
Gujarati, Damodar N., Chʻung-yŏng An, Sŏng-pʻyo Hong, and Wan-gyu Pak. 計量經濟學 : 基礎  Kyeryang kyŏngjehak: kichʻo. Sŏul Tʻŭkpyŏlsi: Chinyŏngsa, 1994. (Korean translation)
Gujarati, Damodar N., Ümit Şenesen, and Gülay Günlük Şenesen. Temel ekonometri. Literatür Yayınları, 33. İstanbul: Literatür, 2001. (Turkish translation)
Gujarati, Damodar N. Econometria básica. São Paulo: Makron Books, 2000.(Portuguese translation)
Gujarati, Damodar N. Pensions and New York City's Fiscal Crisis. Studies in social security and retirement policy. Washington: American Enterprise Institute for Public Policy Research, 1978.    (held in 476 worldcat libraries)
Gujarati, Damodar N. Government and Business. New York: McGraw-Hill, 1984.

References

1930s births
Living people
American people of Indian descent
American economists
University of Mumbai alumni
University of Chicago alumni
United States Military Academy faculty